Nordli's Cabinet governed Norway between 15 January 1976 and 4 February 1981. The Labour Party cabinet was led by Odvar Nordli. It had the following composition:

Cabinet members

|}

References

Notes

Nordli
Nordli
1976 establishments in Norway
1981 disestablishments in Norway
Cabinets established in 1976
Cabinets disestablished in 1981